The Adelaide–Wolseley railway line is a 313 kilometre line running from Adelaide to Wolseley on the Australian Rail Track Corporation network. It is the South Australian section of the Melbourne–Adelaide railway.

History
The line opened in stages: on 14 March 1883 from Adelaide to Aldgate, on 28 November 1883 to Nairne, on 1 May 1886 to Bordertown and on 19 January 1887 to Serviceton. The line consisted of double track as far as Belair, where it became single track for the remainder of the journey east. Along its 313 km length, there are 18 crossing loops. In 1995, the track was converted to standard gauge as part of the gauge conversion of the line to Melbourne. This included one of the lines west of Belair, effectively converting this section to two single lines. In 2009, the Belair line was relaid with dual gauge sleepers that will allow it to be converted to standard gauge in the future.

Originally operated by South Australian Railways, in March 1978, it was transferred to Australian National and in July 1998 to the Australian Rail Track Corporation. Until April 1987, the State Transport Authority services then operated on the first 37 kilometres of the line from Adelaide to Bridgewater, when they were curtailed to Belair, the terminus of today's Adelaide Metro Belair line. TransAdelaide succeeded the STA in operating the line in 1994.

Route
Major towns on the route include Murray Bridge, Tailem Bend, Keith and Bordertown.

Services
Today the route is mainly served by interstate freight services operated by Pacific National and SCT Logistics. Intrastate grain freight services from the Loxton and Pinnaroo lines operated by Genesee & Wyoming Australia ceased operating in July 2015. Grain services from Tailem Bend and Wolseley run regularly via One Rail Australia trains.

Journey Beyond's The Overland is the only scheduled passenger service to traverse the full route, calling at Murray Bridge and Bordertown stations. Adelaide Metro services operate from Adelaide to Belair.

References

Railway lines in South Australia
Railway lines opened in 1887
Standard gauge railways in Australia